Širom is Slovenian trio formed in 2015, consisting of Iztok Koren (banjo, bass drum, chimes, balafon), Ana Kravanja (violin, viola, ribab, kalimba, bendir, balafon) and Samo Kutin (ukulele, kalimba, tamburica, harps, balafon, sound objects).

Širom play vividly textured and mostly imagined folk music(s). Fusing handmade and global instruments with fearless sound exploration, the results are unbound by tradition or geography.

Members of the trio come from Prekmurje, the Tolmin area, and the Karst Plateau. Their work is noted for its fusion of polyphony and psychedelic music with folk, classical and improvisational elements. Their first album was released in 2016.

Their song 'Trilogija' was 'Song of the Day' on KEXP Radio from Seattle in March, 2017.

The band released the second album 'I Can Be a Clay Snapper' on September 8, 2017 on German label tak:til.

Discography 
 2016 : I. (Klopotec / ZARŠ)
 2017 : I Can Be a Clay Snapper (tak:til / Glitterbeat)
 2019 : A Universe that Roasts Blossoms for a Horse
 2022 : The Liquified Throne of Simplicity

References

External links 
 Bandcamp page
 Official website
 Review on Rootstime

Musical groups established in 2015
Slovenian musical groups
2015 establishments in Slovenia